Ligne des Bambous is a village on the island of Réunion, located near its southern coast in the commune of Saint-Pierre.

Populated places in Réunion